Malapert might refer to:

People 
Charles Malapert, Jesuit scientist
Leslie de Malapert Thuillier, military personnel in the British Army 
Robert-Georg Freiherr von Malapert, military personnel in the Luftwaffe

Other  
Malapert, a series of Lunar features